Baseball at the 1988 Summer Olympics was a demonstration sport for the seventh time. Eight teams competed in Jamsil Baseball Stadium in the baseball tournament. The format used was the same as the tournament of four years earlier. Five teams that had competed in the 1984 tournament returned.

Teams
  (1987 Asian Baseball Championship fifth place) (invited)
  (1987 Pan American Games fourth place, defeat 1987 European Baseball Championship silver medalist  in a playoff)
  (1987 Asian Baseball Championship gold medalist)
  (1984 Olympics gold medalist)
  (1987 European Baseball Championship gold medalist)
  (1987 Pan American Games bronze medalist)
  (Hosts)
  (1987 Pan American Games silver medalist)

Preliminary round
There were two pools for the preliminary round. Teams played each of the three other teams in their division.

Blue Division

White Division

Knockout round

Semifinals
The semifinals pitted the first-place team of each division against the second-place team of the other division.  Thus, Japan (3-0) played against Korea (2-1), which had a tied record with the United States (2-1) but had lost in head-to-head competition against them.  The first-place Americans played against Puerto Rico (2-1).

Third-place final
The third-place final pitted the losers of the semifinals against each, with the winner taking third place and the loser taking fourth.

First-place final
The winners of the semifinals played each other for first and second place.  In a rematch of the 1984 final, the reigning champion Japanese team lost to the United States. Since baseball was a demonstration sport, no official medals were awarded.

Rosters

United States

Source:

Jim Abbott, P
Bret Barberie, IF
Andy Benes, P
Jeff Branson, IF
Mike Fiore, OF
Tom Goodwin, OF
Ty Griffin, IF
Andrew Kobliska, OF 
Tino Martinez, IF
Bill Masse, OF
Ben McDonald, P
Mike Milchin, IF/P
Mickey Morandini, OF
Charles Nagy, P
Doug Robbins, C
Scott Servais, C
Dave Silvestri, IF
Joe Slusarski, P
Ed Sprague, IF
Robin Ventura, IF
Ted Wood, OF
Mark Marquess, head coach
Skip Bertman, assistant coach
Dave Bingham, assistant coach
Ron Polk, assistant coach

Japan

Source:

1 Masafumi Nishi, IF 
2 Hiroki Katsuragi, IF 
3 Kunji Yonezaki, IF 
6 Kenjiro Nomura, IF 
8 Terushi Nakajima, OF 
9 Hirofumi Ogawa, IF 
10 Daisuke Tsutsui, IF 
11 Tetsuya Shiozaki, P
12 Tomio Watanabe, P
14 Tetsu Suzuki, P
15 So Kikuchi, P
16 Shuji Yoshida, P
18 Takehiro Ishii, P 
19 Hideo Nomo, P 
20 Atsuya Furuta, C 
21 Makoto Maeda, OF 
22 Atsuyoshi Otake, C 
25 Yasushi Matsumoto, OF
27 Kenji Tomashino, OF
28 Tsuyoshi Omori, IF
30 Yoshinobu Suzuki, head coach
31 Katsuji Kawashima, assistant coach
32 Masatake Nakayama, assistant coach

Canada

 Rob Butler
 Bill Byckowski
 Rheal Cormier
 Randy Curran
 Gregory Duce
 Marc Griffin
 Stewart Hillman
 Peter Hoy
 Lome Franklin Humber
 Rick Johnston
 James Kotkas
 Alan Mauthe
 Thomas Nelson
 Greg O'Halloran
 Barry Parisotto
 Greg Roth
 David Rypien
 Warren Sawkiw
 Matt Stairs
 Dave Wainhouse

Australia

 Anthony Adamson
 Barrie Bahnert
 David Buckthorpe
 Scott Cameron
 David Clarkson
 Jon Deeble
 Malcolm Gregg
 Shaun Harbar
 Gregory Harvey
 Kim Jessop
 Geoffrey Martin
 Parris Mitchell
 Michael Nind
 Matthew Sheldon-Collins
 Peter Hartas
 Tony Thomson
 Peter Vogler
 Grant Weir
 Darren Welch
 Peter Wood

Chinese Taipei

  Chin-Mou Chen
 Yi-Hsin Chen
 Tai-Chuan Chiang
 Cheng-Chin Hong
 I-Chung Hong
 Chiung-Lung Huang
 Ping-Yang Huang
 Cheng-Cherng Kuo
 Chien-Fu Kuo Lee
 Chu-Ming Lee
 I-Tseng Lin
 Tzung-Chiu Lin
 Chen-Jung Lo
 Kuo-Chong Lo
 Chi-Chen Tseng
 Hung-Chin Tu
 Kuang-Huei Wang
 Fu-Lien Wu
 Shih-Hsin Wu
 Chieh-Jen Yang

The Netherlands

 Frank Bos
 Eric de Bruin
 Peter Callenbach
 Robert Eenhoorn
 Rikkert Faneyte
 Ron Giroldi
 Bill Groot
 Gerlach Halderman
 Jacky Jacoba
 Marcel Joost
 Robert Knol
 Frank Koot
 Harry Koster
 Marcel Kruyt
 Alfred de Leeuw
 Hans van Renselaar
 Ronald Stoovelaar
 Bart Volkerijk
 Eric de Vries
 Haitze de Vries

Puerto Rico

 Albert Bracero
 Elliot Cianchini
 Luis O. Davila
 Jesus I. Feliciano
 James C. Figueroa
 Anthony Garcia
 Efrain Garcia
 Eddie Horrio
 Jose Lorenzana
 Victor L. Martinez
 Roberto Mateo
 Jose V. Melendez
 Angel A. Morales
 Benedicto Poupart
 Mariano Quinones
 Luis Ramos
 Jorge Robles
 Abimael Rosario
 Roberto Santana
 Wilfredo Velez

South Korea

 Baek Jae-woo
 Chang Ho-ick
 Cho Kye-yun
 Choi Hae-myoung
 Choi Hoo-jae
 Hwang Dae-yeon
 Kang Ki-woong
 Kang Young-soo
 Kim Dong-soo
 Kim Ki-bum
 Kim Kyung-ki
 Kim Tae-hyoung
 Kwon Taek-jae
 Lee Kang-chul
 Lee Kwang-woo
 Lee Suk-jae
 Park Dong-hee
 Roh Chan-yup
 Song Gu-hong
 Song Jin-woo

Final standings

References
 
 Official Report. Official Report Volume 2: Competition Summary and Results. 1988.

 
1988 Summer Olympics events
1988
1988 in baseball
1988
Olympic demonstration sports
Men's events at the 1988 Summer Olympics